The Prince's Charities is a non-profit organisation that has associations with King Charles III. The Prince's Charities, supported by The Prince's Charities Foundation, is based in the United Kingdom and comprises 19 organisations of which Charles is patron or president, 18 of which were founded personally by him. The name derives from Charles's status as the Prince of Wales before his accession on 8 September 2022.

The Prince's Charities

Structure
Most of the charities are independent of each other and all are each run by their own boards. King Charles is president of all the charities and founded 17 of them; however, as president, he is a figurehead and public face for the charities involved and has no legal responsibility. The aim of The Prince's Charities is "to improve the overall effectiveness of the group, building on shared strengths to ensure their long term success and sustainability." The costs of the office are paid for by The Prince's Charities Foundation.

In autumn 2010, Prince Charles published a book, Harmony: A New Way of Looking at Our World, and produced a film, both articulating the principles and underlying philosophies of many of these charities.

Development
Through 2003 and 2004, a small office was established within the Office of the Prince of Wales to deal specifically with Prince Charles' charitable work. Sir Tom Shebbeare took up the new position of Director of Charities, with particular responsibility for the development and good governance of the 16 operational charities in which Charles had a particular interest. By the following year, the group had been given a new identity, The Prince's Charities, and the Charities Office had developed new policies and procedures for the group. The Charities Office, set up at Clarence House, employed by 2008 some eight full-time staff. The charities form the largest multi-cause charitable enterprise in the UK and collectively work in 38 countries. They together raise approximately £150 million each year.

In addition to independent charities, Charles established a number of separate charitable initiatives, which include Mosaic, a Muslim youth mentoring campaign; The Prince's Wool Project, to support the UK wool industry; START, to help promote sustainable living; The Cambrian Mountain Initiative, to support the economy in that area of Wales; and The Prince's Rainforest Project, to protect rainforests. In 2011, the Pakistan Recovery Fund was developed, which is intended to support the recovery from the floods seen in that country in 2010.

Charities in The Prince's Charities group
The charities in The Prince's Charities group are often grouped according to the areas of charitable activity that they are involved with.

 Opportunity and enterprise
 The Prince's Trust
The Prince's Trust International
The Prince's Trust Australia
The Prince's Trust Canada
The Prince's Trust New Zealand
The Prince's Trust America
 The Prince's Scottish Youth Business Trust
 PRIME
 PRIME Cymru
 The Prince's Youth Business International
 The British Asian Trust
 Youth Business Scotland

 Education
 The Prince's Drawing School
 The Prince's School of Traditional Arts
 The Prince's Teaching Institute
 The Prince's Foundation for Children and The Arts

 The built environment
 The Great Steward of Scotland's Dumfries House Trust (renamed The Prince's Foundation in 2018)
 The Prince's Foundation for the Built Environment (merged into The Prince's Foundation in 2018)
 The Prince's Regeneration Trust (merged into The Prince's Foundation in 2018)
 The Turquoise Mountain Foundation

 Responsible business and the natural environment
 The Prince's Countryside Fund
 Business in the Community
 Scottish Business in the Community
 The Cambridge Institute for Sustainability Leadership
 Arts & Business
 In Kind Direct

 Closed charities
 The Prince's Foundation for Integrated Health

The Prince's Charities Foundation

The Prince's Charities Foundation also has a number of wholly owned subsidiary companies: Duchy Originals Ltd, the Prince's Charities Events, and Traditional Arts Ltd. The Highgrove Shop is part of the A.G. Carrick company.

References

External links
 The Prince's Charities Facebook page
 The Prince's Charities Twitter page
 The Prince's Operation Entrepreneur Video 
 National Post: Interview: Michael McMillan, CEO, Blue Ant Media
 CBC The National: The Prince's Operation Entrepreneur

 
Charities based in Canada
Charities based in Australia
The Prince's Trust
Non-profit organisations based in Victoria (Australia)